Nowhere to Go is a 1958 British crime film directed by Seth Holt in his directorial debut. It stars George Nader, Maggie Smith (receiving her first screen credit), Bernard Lee, Harry H. Corbett and Bessie Love. The plot concerns a criminal who escapes from jail and attempts to recover his stashed loot but is shunned by the criminal community and hunted by the police.

Originally edited down as part of a double bill, the full-length version of Nowhere to Go was released on DVD in January 2013.

Holt called Nowhere to Go "the least Ealing film ever made."

Plot 
Paul Gregory, a Canadian confidence trickster operating in London, targets a wealthy Canadian woman in Britain to sell her collection of valuable coins. After meeting her at an ice hockey match, he sets about winning her confidence until she is prepared to grant him legal control over the sale. He completes the deal without her knowledge, stores the money from the sale in a safe deposit box and then deliberately waits to be caught by the police. Gregory plans on receiving a five-year sentence, with time off for good behaviour, and then collecting his loot when he is released.

However, the judge makes an example of the uncooperative Gregory by sentencing him to ten years in prison. While incarcerated, Gregory pays his associate Victor Sloane to help him escape. Almost immediately, things begin to go wrong. Fearing arrest, he is unable to recover the money from the safe. Sloane also begins to demand more money and threatens violence, and Gregory is forced to retaliate.

Gregory tries to procure assistance from his fellow criminals, calling upon an established code that exists among them. But when Sloane is found dead, having accidentally choked on a gag that Gregory had placed in his mouth, they refuse to offer him any assistance, as he is now too "warm."

With the manhunt rapidly approaching, Gregory tries to escape with the help of Bridget Howard, a disillusioned ex-débutante and niece of a chief constable. She drives Gregory to a deserted cottage near her family's rural home outside Brecon. While in hiding, he witnesses the police arrive to question Bridget, assumes the worst and flees again. Attempting to steal a farmer's bicycle, he is shot in the shoulder. He drives away in a stolen lorry but crashes and loses consciousness, and he is found by another farmer. Bridget tells the police nothing as she waits in vain for Gregory at the cottage before walking into the distance.

Cast

Production 
The film was based on the debut novel by Donald MacKenzie, a former prisoner, that was published in 1956. The Manchester Guardian wrote that "the reader is swept along until the very last page." It was published in the U.S. as Manhunt. The New York Times described it as "highly rewarding".

Nowhere to Go was produced at MGM-British Studios in Borehamwood but was released under the Ealing Studios banner. Ealing had moved to the Borehamwood studios following the sale of its own studio base in 1955.

In December 1956, Ealing listed Nowhere to Go among a slate of movies planned for the following year in conjunction with MGM; others included Davy and Dunkirk. Harry Watt was originally scheduled to direct the film, but he was reassigned to The Siege of Pinchgut (1959), which was to be the last Ealing film. Seth Holt, a longtime film editor at Ealing, became the director, and he was the last major beneficiary of studio head Michael Balcon's policy of promoting from within.

The script was cowritten by Kenneth Tynan, who worked at Ealing for two years. This was the only script of his to be filmed while there. He wrote the script with Holt, who said "I did the action bits and he did the dialogue." Holt said that when writing, "I was determined that if we had a criminal as a central figure then we would not have this element of self pity that was so prevalent in those days."

George Nader appeared in the film just after his long-term contract with Universal had ended. He arrived in London on 3 December 1957.

Maggie Smith was a rising stage star and one of 11 artists under contract to Ealing.

Holt said: "I was very  to make something rather stylish." He also said that Balcon was very supportive, although "in the end he ratted on me slightly by agreeing with MGM to cut out a quarter of an hour of the film. It might not have been a mistake, I don’t know. They were good sequences that went. One was with Lily Kahn; one was with a girl that plays his wife in a flashback to her visit to prison. They were good acting sequences. The visit to prison is a very good scene, utterly flat and miserable. On the other hand I must confess you don’t have to have it."

Release 
Nowhere to Go was the first Ealing film under the MGM arrangement not to receive a standalone release. Instead, MGM trimmed the film to a length of 89 minutes and released it in the UK on the bottom half of a double bill with the World War II submarine drama Torpedo Run. The pairing premiered in the West End on 4 December 1958 at Fox's Rialto Theatre rather than one of MGM's two West End outlets. A UK general release began on the ABC circuit from 11 January 1959.

Reception

Critical
Sight & Sound wrote that the film "looked decidedly promising. In fact it is a failure, though neither negligible nor unintelligent; and the reasons for failure are themselves revealing... it never quite makes up its mind about its central character, presenting him at one moment as an enemy of society, then sentimentalising over him as a fugitive and victim; and it provides scarcely a shred of plausible motivation for the girl... a picture which often lets its story slide while it fills in background detail." 
 
David Thomson later called the film "a cool, supremely visual thriller that in terms of its minimal dialogue and daring narrative playfulness is closer to the world of Jean-Pierre Melville than to any British precedents."

Box office
According to MGM records, the film earned $145,000 in the U.S. and Canada and $450,000 elsewhere, resulting in a loss of $242,000.

Director Seth Holt said that after the film came out, "I was out on my ear and didn’t get any work at all for a long time... Nowhere to Go dropped like a stone. I like to think, if it had been about two years later, people would have noticed it." He returned to editing for several years until an executive at Hammer Film Productions who had liked Nowhere to Go hired him for Taste of Fear (1961).

References

Further reading

External links 
 
 
Nowhere to Go at Letterbox DVD
Nowhere to Go at Reelstreets

1958 films
British crime films
Ealing Studios films
Films directed by Seth Holt
Films set in London
Films set in England
Films set in Wales
1958 crime films
Metro-Goldwyn-Mayer films
Films shot at MGM-British Studios
1950s English-language films
1950s British films